Edoardo Alaimo (8 January 1893 – 13 March 1962) was an Italian fencer. He competed in three events at the 1912 Summer Olympics in Stockholm, Sweden.

References

1893 births
1962 deaths
Italian male fencers
Olympic fencers of Italy
Fencers at the 1912 Summer Olympics
Sportspeople from Palermo